Cornice Mountain may refer to:

 Cornice Mountain (Cambria Icefield)
 Cornice Mountain (Stikine Icecap)